Khiva is a city in Xorazm Region, Uzbekistan.

Khiva may also refer to:

 FK Khiva, a football club based in Khiva
 Khanate of Khiva, a former Central Asian polity
 Khiva District, an Uzbek district encompassing Khiva

See also
 Kiva (disambiguation)